Kirby Heyborne (born October 8, 1976) is an American actor, musician, singer, songwriter, narrator and comedian. He is known for his work in films centered around the culture of the Church of Jesus Christ of Latter-day Saints (LDS Church). Heyborne has also worked extensively as an audiobook narrator, narrating more than 300 books. He has won two Odyssey Awards and an Audie Award for Middle Grade Title. In 2015, Booklist named him a Voice of Choice narrator.

Early life and education 
Heyborne graduated from Alta High School in 1995 where he was student body president. He is a member of the LDS Church and served as a missionary for the church in the Dominican Republic. He later graduated from the University of Utah with a degree in Economics.

Career 
Heyborne is both an actor and a musician. He has released several CDs on which he sings and plays the guitar. However, Heyborne first became widely popular in LDS Church culture after starring in the film The R.M. (2003). His first appearance in a non-LDS film was as "Teddy" in The Three Stooges (2012).

He is also an accomplished narrator, and has provided voice work for many novels, short stories, and non-fiction titles.

Heyborne generated some controversy in the Latter-day Saint community in 2008 after deciding to appear in a Miller Lite beer commercial. Devout members of the LDS Church do not drink alcohol, and his appearance in a beer commercial was perceived as hypocritical. Heyborne stated that he would prefer to act only in roles aligned with his faith but was unable to predict which offers he might receive. He interpreted the Miller Lite opportunity as an answer to prayer, and a way to feed his family. He was later denied the chance to play at LDS Church-owned Brigham Young University (BYU), where he had often played in the past, allegedly due to his involvement with the commercial.
He also had appeared in a Best Buy commercial in late-summer 2013, promoting sales for Verizon phones for an upcoming back-to-school sale. This commercial aired during the CBS primetime lineup on August 26, 2013. In 2019, he began as host for a new show on BYUtv called "Making Good."

Awards and honors
In 2015,  Booklist named Heyborne a Voice of Choice narrator, noting that he has a "skill at voicing accents and dialects, perhaps enhanced by his musical knowledge and ear, comes up frequently in reviews."

Awards

"Best of" lists

Works

Filmography 

Social Suicide (2001) - Tuff Christopherson
The Singles Ward (2002) - Dalen Martin
The R.M. (2003) - Jared Phelps
The Work and the Story (2003) - Ephraim Thomas
Saints and Soldiers (2003) - Flight Sergeant Oberon Winley
The Book of Mormon Movie, Vol. 1: The Journey (2003) - Sam
The Best Two Years (2003) - Elder Hezekiah Calhoun
Everwood (2003) - Mr. Perkins
Hoops (2004) - Ethan
Sons of Provo (2004) - Kirby Laybourne
The Last Chapter (2004) - Jonathan
Pirates of the Great Salt Lake (2006) - Kirk Redgrave/Nose Beard
Lazy Muncie (2006) - Himself
Free Ride (2006) - Dylan Hudney
Take a Chance (2006) - Eugene Buddles
Praise to the Man (2006) - Oliver Cowdery
Together Again for the First Time (2008) - Roger Wolders
The Singles 2nd Ward (2007) - Dalen Martin
Scout Camp (2009) - Kerry
Midway to Heaven (2011) - David
The Three Stooges (2012) - Teddy
Sorry (2013)
The Client List (2013, TV series, season 1 episode 7)
Extinct (2017, TV series) - voice of Red Drone

Discography 
Inside - (2005)
Braver Days ( May 2006)
Merry White Tree in the Night (Oct 2006)
The RM Soundtrack - "If You Could Hie to Kolob"
Sons of Provo Soundtrack
The Gone Away World by Nick Harkaway - Narrator (2008)
Nick & Norah's Infinite Playlist by Rachel Cohn & David Levithan - Narrator (2008)
The Elm Tree - Released March 31, 2009
The Long Walk by Stephen King writing as Richard Bachman - Narrator (2010)
Fat Vampire by Adam Rex - Narrator (2010)
Rotters by Daniel Kraus - Narrator (2011)
Everybody Sees the Ants by A. S. King - Narrator (2012)
Come to Zion, Vol. 1: The Winds and the Waves by Dean Hughes - Narrator (2012)
 Gone Girl by Gillian Flynn - Narrator (with Julia Whelan) (2012)
Scowler by Daniel Kraus - Narrator (2013)
Breathe by Abbi Glines - Narrator (2013)
Taipei by Tao Lin - Narrator (2013)
Come to Zion, Vol. 2: Through Cloud and Sunshine by Dean Hughes - Narrator (2013)
Fifteen Minutes by Karen Kingsbury - Narrator (2013)
Hollow City by Ransom Riggs - Narrator (2014)
Rumble by Ellen Hopkins - Narrator (2014)
The Family of Jesus by Karen Kingsbury - Narrator (with January LaVoy) (2014)
Angels Walking by Karen Kingsbury - Narrator (with January LaVoy) (2014)
A Generation Rising (Fire and Steel, Vol. 1) by Gerald N. Lund - Narrator (2014)
Only the Brave: The Continuing Story of the San Juan Pioneers by Gerald N. Lund - Narrator (2014)
Come to Zion, Vol. 3: Fresh Courage Take by Dean Hughes - Narrator (2014)
Ashfall by Mike Mullin - Narrator (2015)
All the Bright Places by Jennifer Niven - Narrator (2015)
The Friends of Jesus by Karen Kingsbury - Narrator (with January LaVoy) (2015)
Chasing Sunsets (Angels Walking, book 2) by Karen Kingsbury - Narrator (with January LaVoy) (2015)
The Orphan Army: The Nightsiders, book 1 by Jonathan Maberry - Narrator (2015)
The Storm Descends (Fire and Steel, Vol. 2) by Gerald N. Lund - Narrator (2015) 
Library of Souls by Ransom Riggs - Narrator (2015) 
Fires of Invention (Mysteries of Cove, Vol. 1) by Jeffrey Scott Savage - Narrator (2015)
Youngblood by Matt Gallagher - Narrator (2016)
To Soar with Eagles by Gerald N. Lund - Narrator (2016)
Brush of Wings (Angels Walking, book 3) by Karen Kingsbury - Narrator (with January LaVoy) (2016)
The Shadow Falls (Fire and Steel, Vol. 3) by Gerald N. Lund - Narrator (2016)
Gears of Revolution (Mysteries of Cove, Vol. 2) by Jeffrey Scott Savage - Narrator (2016)
A Baxter Family Christmas (The Baxters) by Karen Kingsbury - Narrator (with January LaVoy) (2016)
Dragonwatch: A Fablehaven Adventure (Dragonwatch, Vol. 1) by Brandon Mull - Narrator (2017)
The Proud Shall Stumble (Fire and Steel, Vol. 4) by Gerald N. Lund - Narrator (2017)
Love Story (The Baxters) by Karen Kingsbury - Narrator (with January LaVoy) (2017)
In This Moment (The Baxters) by Karen Kingsbury - Narrator (with January LaVoy) (2017)
Embers of Destruction (Mysteries of Cove, Vol. 3) by Jeffrey Scott Savage - Narrator (2017)
Out of the Smoke (Fire and Steel, Vol. 5) by Gerald N. Lund - Narrator (2018)
’’I Am Not A Serial Killer (John Cleaver, Vol. 1)’’ by Dan Wells - Narrator (2018)
Dragonwatch: Wrath of the Dragon King (Dragonwatch, Vol. 2) by Brandon Mull - Narrator (2018)
A Map of Days by Ransom Riggs - Narrator (2018)
To the Moon and Back (The Baxters) by Karen Kingsbury - Narrator (with January LaVoy) (2018)
When We Were Young (The Baxters) by Karen Kingsbury - Narrator (with January LaVoy) (2018)
Two Weeks (The Baxters) by Karen Kingsbury - Narrator (with January LaVoy) (2019)
Into the Flames (Fire and Steel, Vol. 6) by Gerald N. Lund - Narrator (2019)
Muddy: Where Faith and Polygamy Collide (Muddy, Vol. 1) by Dean Hughes - Narrator (2019)
Dragonwatch: Master of the Phantom Isle (Dragonwatch, Vol. 3) by Brandon Mull - Narrator (2019)
River: Where Faith and Consecration Converge (Muddy, Vol. 2) by Dean Hughes - Narrator (2020)
The Volunteer Effect by Jason Young and Jonathan Malm - Narrator (2020)
Dragonwatch: Champion of the Titan Games (Dragonwatch, Vol. 4) by Brandon Mull - Narrator (2020)
Someone Like You (The Baxters) by Karen Kingsbury - Narrator (with January LaVoy) (2020)
Truly, Madly Deeply (The Baxters) by Karen Kingsbury - Narrator (with January LaVoy) (2020)
A Distant Shore by Karen Kingsbury - Narrator (with January LaVoy) (2021)
Dragonwatch: Return of the Dragon Slayers (Dragonwatch, Vol. 5) by Brandon Mull - Narrator (2021)

References

External links 
 Official Kirby Heyborne site
 

1976 births
American Mormon missionaries in the Dominican Republic
Living people
Musicians from Utah
People from Evanston, Wyoming
Place of birth missing (living people)
University of Utah alumni
Latter Day Saints from Wyoming
American male film actors
American male voice actors
Latter Day Saints from Utah